A First Deputy Chairman of the Government of the Russian Federation, commonly referred to as the First Deputy Prime Minister, is a member of the Russian Government. The First Deputy is to be proposed by the Prime Minister, and approved by the President. However, this office is not provisioned by Constitution and it is not a separate office.

The Chapter 6 of the Constitution of Russia says, that "The Government of the Russian Federation consists of the Chairman of the Government of the Russian Federation, Deputy Chairman of the Government of the Russian Federation and federal ministries". First of all, First Vice-Premier is Vice-Premier, all others are distribution of responsibilities among Vice-Premiers inside the Government. There can be more than one First Vice-Premier, therefore written distribution of responsibilities is the most important document. The Federal constitutional law "On the Government of the Russian Federation" says "in the case of temporary absence of the Chairman of the Government of the Russian Federation, his duties are performed by one of the Deputy Chairmen of the Government of the Russian Federation in accordance with a written distribution of responsibilities". It's automatically and President's Executive Order is not required in that moment.

List

First Deputy Premiers of Soviet Russia

Timeline

Notes

References

Sources 
Rulers.org

Government of Russia
Russia
Lists of political office-holders in Russia